, born , was a Japanese writer. Akazome won the 143rd Akutagawa Prize and the 99th Bungakukai Prize before her death in 2017.

Biography

Akazome graduated from the Kyoto University of Foreign Studies, where she studied German, in 1996. She entered graduate school at Hokkaido University intending to become an academic, but instead started writing stories that reflected her Kyoto upbringing.

Her 2010 book , about a group of women in a German class reading Anne Frank's The Diary of a Young Girl, generated controversy for using a casual writing style to discuss serious subject matter. Otome no mikkoku won the 143rd Akutagawa Prize, with the selection committee praising the use of humor to discuss social problems. The next year her book  was published by Bungeishunjū. It was nominated for the Oda Sakunosuke Prize.

Akazome died of acute pneumonia in 2017 at the age of 42.

Recognition
 2004 99th Bungakukai Prize
 2010 143rd Akutagawa Prize (2010上)

Works
 , Bungeishunjū, 2007, 
 , Shinchosha, 2010, 
 , Bungeishunjū, 2011,

References

1974 births
Japanese women novelists
21st-century Japanese women writers
People from Kyoto
Japanese novelists
2017 deaths
Akutagawa Prize winners